The 1919 season in Swedish football, starting January 1919 and ending December 1919:

Honours

Official titles

Competitions

Promotions, relegations and qualifications

Promotions

Relegations

Domestic results

Fyrkantserien 1919

Svenska Mästerskapet 1919 
Final

Kamratmästerskapen 1919 
Final

National team results 

 Sweden: 

 Sweden: 

 Sweden: 

 Sweden: 

 Sweden: 

 Sweden: 

 Sweden: 

 Sweden:

National team players in season 1919

Notes

References 
Print

Online

Seasons in Swedish football